Jim Compton (April 2, 1941 – March 17, 2014) was a member of the Seattle City Council, first elected in 1999. At his resignation in December 2005, he was chair of the Utilities & Technology Committee, vice chair of the Energy & Environmental Policy Committee, and a member of the Government Affairs & Labor Committee.

Born in Klamath Falls, Oregon, Compton earned his bachelor's degree in history at Reed College in 1964 and his master's degree at the Columbia University School of Journalism in 1969. He was a Fulbright Scholar.

Before being elected to the Council, Compton was best known for his career in journalism, working for NBC News in Cairo and London from 1977 to 1984. He began working at Seattle's NBC affiliate KING-TV 5 in 1985. He produced The Compton Report, a top-rated weekly news program, during 10 of his 14 years at KING. He also served as a correspondent for The News Hour with Jim Lehrer.

In March 2014, Compton was found dead of an apparent heart attack in his car, after having dinner with friends the previous night. He was 72. He is survived by wife of 10 years, Carol, a Seattle lawyer.

References

American television journalists
Seattle City Council members
Reed College alumni
Columbia University Graduate School of Journalism alumni
1941 births
2014 deaths
American male journalists
Fulbright alumni